Black Brook may refer to:

Places
 Black Brook, Nova Scotia, Canada
 Black Brook, New York, United States
 Black Brook, Wisconsin, United States

Rivers
In England
 Black Brook (Chorley), a small river in Lancashire
 Black Brook, West Yorkshire, a small river near Calderdale
 Black Brook, Leicestershire, a tributary of the River Soar
In the United States

Black Brook (Rum River tributary), in Minnesota
Black Brook (Merrimack River tributary), in New Hampshire
Black Brook (Passaic River tributary), in New Jersey
Black Brook (Whippany River tributary), in New Jersey
Black Brook (Seneca River tributary), in New York
Black Brook (Beaver Kill tributary), in New York
Black Brook (Susquehanna River tributary), in New York

Nature reserves
 Black Brook Nature Reserve, Staffordshire, England

See also 
 
 Black Creek (disambiguation)
 Black River (disambiguation)